Robert Shepherdson (4 September 1913 – 19 August 1992) was an Australian cricketer. He played in one first-class match for South Australia in 1935/36.

See also
 List of South Australian representative cricketers

References

External links
 

1913 births
1992 deaths
Australian cricketers
South Australia cricketers
Cricketers from Adelaide